The Unai Pass or Onai Pass is a mountain pass on the western side of the Paghman Mountains in Jalrez District, Maidan Wardak Province, Afghanistan. It is of strategical importance due to its geographical location to the southwest of Kabul. The Sarchashma River flows through the pass, which is the upstream part of the Kabul River.

Due to its importance, the pass has a long history of being involved in conflict in Afghanistan. In 1929, Muhammad Mir Fath (1901-1964)  was one of three Hazara commanders who defeated the forces of Habibullah Kalakani at the pass between March and September of that year. The mujahedin took the Unai Pass in the spring of 1979 during the war against the Soviet-backed Afghan communist regime, and Jalrez district was one of the earliest districts to be taken. In 1983, the Hazara Al-Nasr group attacked the Harakat Islami in Siasang and the area near the pass.

In 2008, the Ministry of Public Works began the rehabilitation of 136 kilometres of the Kabul highway, aided by 36 million euros funding from the Italian government. The first phase of the project, Lot No 1, began in 2008 with the rehabilitation of a 54 kilometre stretch of earth road starting in Maidan Shar and working towards the Unai Pass.

References

Jalrez District
Mountain passes of Afghanistan
Hazarajat